Eyob Faniel (born 26 November 1992) is an Eritrean-born Italian long-distance runner who won a silver medal at the 2018 Mediterranean Games. He is the national record holder in the marathon with a time of 2:07:19, set on 23 February 2020, at the 2020 Seville Marathon. He finished 20th at the 2020 Summer Olympics, in the Marathon.

Biography
Born in Eritrea, Faniel came to Italy in 2004, he was naturalized in 2015 at 23.

In 2017, he anecdotally won the Venice Marathon when its top runners were mistakenly diverted from the main course by the marathon's staff.

In 2019, he competed in the men's marathon at the 2019 World Athletics Championships held in Doha, Qatar. He finished in 15th place.

In November 2021, he finished in 3nd place in the 2021 New York City Marathon with a time of 2:09:52.

National records
 Half marathon: 1:00:07 ( Siena, 28 February 2021) - current holder
 Marathon: 2:07:19 ( Seville, 23 February 2020) - current holder

Achievements

Personal bests
Half marathon: 1:00:07,  Siena, 26 January 2020
Marathon: 2:07:19,  Seville, 23 February 2020

See also
 National records in the marathon
 Men's marathon Italian record progression
 List of Italian records in athletics
 Italian all-time lists - Marathon
 Italian all-time lists - Half marathon
 Italian team at the running events
 Italy at the 2018 European Athletics Championships
 Italy at the 2018 Mediterranean Games
 Naturalized athletes of Italy

References

External links
 

1992 births
Living people
Sportspeople from Asmara
Italian male long-distance runners
Italian people of Eritrean descent
Eritrean emigrants to Italy
Italian sportspeople of African descent
Athletes (track and field) at the 2018 Mediterranean Games
Mediterranean Games silver medalists for Italy
World Athletics Championships athletes for Italy
Italian male marathon runners
Mediterranean Games medalists in athletics
Naturalised citizens of Italy
Athletics competitors of Fiamme Oro
Athletes (track and field) at the 2020 Summer Olympics
Olympic athletes of Italy